This is a list of hospitals in Bangladesh.

In 2022 the total number of hospitals in Bangladesh was 5,816.
 Asgar Ali Hospital Gandaria, Dhaka
 Ad-din Akij Medical College Hospital, Khulna
 Ad-din Sakina Medical College Hospital, Jessore
 Ad-din Women's Medical College Hospital, Dhaka
 Aichi Hospital, Dhaka
Arif Memorial Hospital, Barishal
 Al Haramain Hospital, Sylhet
 Ambia Memorial Hospital, Barisal
 Anwer Khan Modern Hospital Ltd, Dhaka
 Aysha Memorial Specialised Hospital, Dhaka
 Bangabandhu Memorial Hospital (BBMH), Chittagong
 Bangabandhu Sheikh Mujib Medical University
 Bangladesh College of Nursing
 Bangladesh Eye Hospital Limited, Dhaka
 Bangladesh Medical College Hospital, Dhaka
 Bangladesh Specialized Hospital
 Bangladesh Spine & Orthopaedic General Hospital Ltd, Panthapath, Dhaka.
 Basundhura Hospital (Pvt.) Ltd.
 BGB Hospital
 Bangladesh Institute of Research and Rehabilitation for Diabetes, Endocrine and Metabolic Disorders (BIRDEM)
 BRB Hospital- Panthapath Dhaka
 Cardio Care Specialized and General Hospital Ltd, Dhaka
 Care Hospital, Dhaka
 Care Zone Hospital, Dhaka 
 Catharsis Medical Centre Limited, Gazipur
 Central Hospital, Dhaka
 Chander Hasi Hospital Limited, Habiganj, Sylhet.
 Chittagong Eye Infirmary and Training Hospital 
 Chittagong Maa-O-Shishu Hospital, Chittagong
 Chittagong Diabetic General Hospital
 Chittagong Medical College Hospital
 CMH (Combined Military Hospital)
 Comilla Medical College Hospital, Comilla
 Continental Hospital Ltd.
 Cox's Bazar Hospital for Women & Children, Chittagong
 Dhaka Central International Medical College Hospital, Adabor, Dhaka
Dhaka Community Hospital
 Dhaka Dental College and Hospital
 Dhaka Hospital, Dhaka
 Dhaka Medical College & Hospital
 Dhaka National Medical College And Hospital Institute
 Dhaka Shishu Hospital
 Dinajpur Medical College Hospital
 Dr. Alauddin Ahmed Clinic, Jhalakati
 Duwell Medical
 Eastern Hospital & Medical Research Centre
 Esperto Health Care & Research Center, Dhaka
 Farazy Hospital Ltd, Dhaka
 Farazy Dental Hospital & Research Center, Dhaka
 Gazi Medical College Hospital, Khulna
 Genuine Cancer Hospital Limited, Chittagong
 Gonoshasthaya Nagar Hospital
 Government Homeopathic Medical College Hospital
 Greenland Hospital Limited, Sector - 10, Uttara, Dhaka.
 Holy Family Red Crescent Medical College Hospital, Dhaka
 Ibn Sina Hospital Sylhet Ltd
 Ibn Sina Hospitals, Dhaka
 Institute of Child and Mother Health, Dhaka
 Institute of Laser Surgery & Hospital, Dhaka
 National Institute of Mental Health and Hospital
 Ispahani Islamia Eye Institute and Hospital (IIEI&H)
Japan East West Medical College Hospital, Dhaka
Khwaja Yunus Ali Medical College and Hospital
 Khulna Medical College Hospital, Khulna
 Kumudini Hospital, Tangail
 Kuwait Bangladesh Friendship Govt. Hospital, Uttara, Dhaka
 Labaid Cardiac Hospital, Dhaka
 Labaid Specialized Hospital], Dhaka
 Maa Nursing Home & Diagnostic Centre, Tangail
 Medinova Medical Services Ltd.
 MH Samorita Hospital & Medical College, love Road, Tejgaon, Dhaka
 Mikrani Dental Banasree Dhaka (Dental Hospital) Dhaka
 Mojibunnessa Eye Hospital, Dhaka
 Moulana Bhasani Medical College Hospital, Dhaka
 Mount Adora Hospital, Sylhet.
 Mental Hospital, Pabna
 Mymensingh Medical College Hospital
 National Hospital Chattagram, Chattagram
 National Heart Foundation, Sylhet.
 National Institute of Cardiovascular Diseases
 National Institute of Ear, Nose and Throat
 National Institute of Kidney Disease & Urology
 National Institute of Mental Health
 National Institute of Neuroscience
 National Institute of Preventive and Social Medicine
 North East Medical College and Hospital
 Nurjahan Hospital Ltd, Sylhet.
 Oasis Hospital (Pvt) Ltd, Sylhet
 Sylhet, M.A.G Osmani Medical College and Hospital
 Pongu Hospital Jessore (Railget, Mujib Sarak, Jessore, Bangladesh)
 Popular Specialized Hospital Ltd.
 Rajshahi Medical College Hospital
 Rangpur Medical College Hospital, Rangpur
 Rashmono General Hospital, Dhaka
 Royal Hospital and research Center Ltd., Chittagong
 Royal Hospital And Research Center Ltd., Chittagong
 Saint Martin Hospital
 Samorita Hospital Ltd.
 Saphena Women's Dental College & Hospital
 Shaheed Monsur Ali Medical College Hospital, Dhaka
 Shaheed Ziaur Rahman Medical College Hospital, Bogra
 Shalahuddin Hospital
 Sheikh Fazilatunnessa Mujib Memorial KPJ Specialized Hospital & Nursing College
 Sher-e-Bangla Medical College Hospital, Barisal
 Siddiqia Eye Foundation, Mymensingh
 Sir Salimullah Medical College & Mitford Hospital, Dhaka
 Square Hospital Ltd., Dhaka
 Sylhet Eye Hospital & Laser Centre
 Sylhet Maa O Shishu Hospital
 Sylhet Medical College Hospital
 Sylhet Women's Medical College
 The Medical College for Women and Hospital
 Union Specialized Hospital Limited, Aftabnagor, Dhaka
 Z.H. Sikder Women's Medical College and Hospital (Pvt.) Ltd.
 Shaheed Ahsan Ullah Master General Hospital
 Shaheed Suhrawardy Medical College & Hospital

References

Bangladesh
 List
Hospitals
Bangladesh